Losta is a railway station for freight trains in Vologda, Russia. It is located on Northern Railway.

References 

Railway stations in Vologda Oblast
Railway stations opened in 1946